Kirkby-in-Furness is a railway station on the Cumbrian Coast Line, which runs between  and . It is owned by Network Rail and managed by Northern Trains.

The name Kirkby-in-Furness did not exist until the creation of the railway line. The village in fact is an amalgamation of six smaller villages and hamlets. The name was chosen almost at random by the train company for the station and was eventually used for the collection of villages. 

In Victorian times, the station gained fame as the station with the longest platform seat in the country. However, this was removed many years ago.

Facilities
There are no longer any permanent buildings at the station apart from a footbridge and shelters on each platform (that on the northbound one being the more substantial). The station has (like others on the line) been fitted with a ticket vending machine, to allow passengers to buy their tickets prior to travel. Step-free access is available to both platforms, though this requires the use of a barrow crossing for northbound passengers and so care must be taken when used. Train running information is provided by telephone, digital display screens and timetable posters.

Services

The last two evening northbound trains terminate at Millom.

A Sunday service (the first for more than forty years) was introduced at the May 2018 timetable change - this runs broadly hourly from mid-morning until the early evening (though some services only run to/from Millom).

References

External links

 
 

Furness
Railway stations in Cumbria
DfT Category F2 stations
Former Furness Railway stations
Railway stations in Great Britain opened in 1846
Northern franchise railway stations
Railway request stops in Great Britain
1846 establishments in England